Milwaukee Airport Railroad Station is an Amtrak railway station which opened for service on January 18, 2005. The facility accommodates travelers who use the Hiawatha Service between Chicago and the Milwaukee Intermodal Station, and sees fourteen daily arrivals, seven each from Milwaukee and Chicago. The Empire Builder also uses these tracks, but does not stop at this station. There is a free shuttle between the station and the airport terminal.

Service and facilities

The Milwaukee Airport Rail Station's primary functions are to serve as an airport rail link for Milwaukee Mitchell International Airport and to serve as an alternate to the downtown Milwaukee station for residents of the southern portions of the Milwaukee metropolitan area. The station is served only by the Amtrak Hiawatha Service, and sees fourteen daily arrivals, seven each from Milwaukee Intermodal Station and Chicago Union Station. The station is the first stop en route to Chicago,  from Milwaukee with a with a travel time of about 10 minutes. It is also the third stop en route to downtown Milwaukee, with a travel time along the  section taking one hour and 14 minutes. In Amtrak's , the station handled  passengers.

The  station includes a Quik-Trak ticket machine, restrooms, a seating area, and covered walkways to both the drive-up area and the boarding platform. As the station is unstaffed, all tickets from the station need to be purchased online, from the Quik-Trak machine or on the train from a conductor. Passengers needing checked baggage service are advised to use the downtown station. The station parking lot contains 300 spaces and a fee is charged to park. All revenue generated from parking fees is used to finance the station's operating costs. Transport to and from the airport terminal is provided by the free shuttle buses operated by the airport.

For much of the spring of 2020, it was temporarily a stop on the Empire Builder, a long-distance train connecting Chicago to the Pacific Northwest. The stop was added when Hiawatha Service trains were suspended in the wake of the COVID-19 pandemic.

History
The idea of opening an Amtrak station in the vicinity of Mitchell Airport had been discussed since the mid-1970s. The justification for not building the station at the time was based on infrequent Amtrak service and relatively congestion-free access to the airport from the south via I-94 and WI 119. By the late 1990s, a station at the airport was proposed as part of the Midwest Regional Rail Initiative. In June 2001, the Wisconsin Department of Transportation authorized $100,000 to start the preliminary design for the station, with an original opening slated for late-2003. Although funding was authorized for preliminary work, funding for actual construction had not been secured.

How to fund construction of the station became an issue following objections from both airport and Milwaukee County officials. Although supported by both airport and local officials, they stated that financing a facility to transport persons primarily away from Milwaukee should not be done with local, but rather state and federal sources. As a result of this sentiment, Senator Herb Kohl requested $5 million for its construction as part of a federal transportation appropriations bill in July, only to see it reduced to $2.5 million in the final bill in December. With an additional $4 million in funding secured by Kohl in February 2003, combined with the $2.5 million previously appropriated, construction of the $6.5 million station could commence.

Groundbreaking for the facility occurred on June 28, 2004. Present at the ceremony was Governor Jim Doyle, Herb Kohl and state Transportation Secretary Frank Busalacchi. Included in the $6.8 million budget were funds for the construction of the station and track improvements to reduce delays between Milwaukee and Chicago. State and local economic development officials saw its construction as an opportunity for travelers from the Chicago metropolitan area to use the station as a rail link to reach Milwaukee Mitchell International Airport as an alternative for both Chicago's Midway and O'Hare airports. The station opened for service on January 18, 2005, as a regular stop along Amtrak's Hiawatha Service. At the time of its opening, this became only the fourth Amtrak station to have direct service to an airport, after Baltimore, Newark and Burbank. In January 2006, the station was awarded an Urban Design Award from Milwaukee mayor Tom Barrett for its design as a "Prairie-style transportation symbol."

In 2009, the Wisconsin Department of Transportation proposed adding  to the southern end of the existing  platform. The station was designed for trains carrying only four coach cars; however, service has since been expanded to five cars with a sixth being proposed for the future.

Statistics

References

External links

Milwaukee Airport Amtrak Station (USA Rail Guide – Train Web)
Milwaukee Mitchell International Airport (Official Site)
Airport information booklet

Amtrak stations in Wisconsin
Transportation in Milwaukee
Railway stations in the United States opened in 2005
Airport railway stations in the United States
2005 establishments in Wisconsin